Yalangur is a rural locality in the Toowoomba Region, Queensland, Australia.

History 
The locality takes its name from its former railway station, which is an Aboriginal word meaning eagle hawk.

References 

Toowoomba Region
Localities in Queensland